The 34th Academy Awards, honoring the best in film for 1961, were held on April 9, 1962, hosted by Bob Hope at the Santa Monica Civic Auditorium in Santa Monica, California.

Robert Wise and Jerome Robbins became the first Best Director co-winners for West Side Story. The film won 10 of its 11 nominations, including Best Picture and both supporting acting Oscars, becoming the most successful musical in Oscars history.

Legendary filmmaker Federico Fellini received his first Best Director nomination for La Dolce Vita, while fellow Italian Sophia Loren became the second performer to win an Oscar for a non-English-language role, after Jane Wyman's American Sign Language performance in Johnny Belinda (1948).

The most memorable event of the night came when Stan Berman, a New York City cabdriver famous for crashing celebrity parties, evaded security and made his way onstage to award Hope a homemade Oscar.

Awards

Nominations are announced on February 26, 1962. Winners are listed first and highlighted with boldface.

Academy Honorary Awards
 William L. Hendricks "for his outstanding patriotic service in the conception, writing and production of the Marine Corps film, A Force in Readiness, which has brought honor to the Academy and the motion picture industry."
 Fred L. Metzler "for his dedication and outstanding service to the Academy of Motion Picture Arts and Sciences."
 Jerome Robbins "for his brilliant achievements in the art of choreography on film."

Irving G. Thalberg Memorial Award
 Stanley Kramer

Jean Hersholt Humanitarian Award
 George Seaton

Presenters and performers

Presenters
 Eddie Albert and Dina Merrill (Presenters: Costume Design Awards)
 Fred Astaire (Presenter: Best Picture)
 Carroll Baker and Richard Chamberlain (Presenters: Art Direction Awards)
 Charles Brackett (Presenter: Jean Hersholt Humanitarian Award to George Seaton)
 Macdonald Carey and Shirley Knight (Presenters: Best Special Effects)
 George Chakiris and Carolyn Jones (Presenters: Documentary Awards)
 Cyd Charisse and Tony Martin (Presenters: Music Awards)
 Wendell Corey (Presenter: Honorary Award to Fred L. Metzler)
 Joan Crawford (Presenter: Best Actor)
 Vince Edwards and Shelley Winters (Presenters: Cinematography Awards)
 Anthony Franciosa and Joanne Woodward (Presenters: Best Sound Recording)
 Arthur Freed (Presenter: Irving G. Thalberg Memorial Award to Stanley Kramer)
 George Hamilton and Glynis Johns (Presenters: Short Subjects Awards)
 Rock Hudson (Presenter: Best Supporting Actress)
 Eric Johnston (Presenter: Best Foreign Language Film)
 Shirley Jones (Presenter: Best Supporting Actor)
 Gene Kelly (Presenter: Honorary Award to Jerome Robbins)
 Burt Lancaster (Presenter: Best Actress)
 Jack Lemmon and Lee Remick (Presenters: Writing Awards)
 Debbie Reynolds (Presenter: Best Original Song)
 Rosalind Russell (Presenter: Best Director)

Performers
 Ann-Margret ("Bachelor in Paradise" from Bachelor in Paradise)
 Gogi Grant ("Pocketful of Miracles" from Pocketful of Miracles)
 Johnny Mathis ("Love Theme from El Cid (The Falcon and the Dove)" from El Cid)
 Gene Pitney ("Town Without Pity" from Town Without Pity)
 Andy Williams ("Moon River" from Breakfast at Tiffany's)

Multiple nominations and awards

These films had multiple nominations:

 12 nominations: Judgment at Nuremberg and West Side Story
 9 nominations: The Hustler
 7 nominations: The Guns of Navarone
 5 nominations: Breakfast at Tiffany's, The Children's Hour, Fanny and Flower Drum Song
 4 nominations: La Dolce Vita and Summer and Smoke
 3 nominations: The Absent-Minded Professor, El Cid and Pocketful of Miracles
 2 nominations: Babes in Toyland, The Parent Trap and Splendor in the Grass

The following films received multiple awards.

 10 wins: West Side Story
 3 wins: Judgment at Nuremberg
 2 wins: Breakfast at Tiffany's and The Hustler

See also
19th Golden Globe Awards
1961 in film
 4th Grammy Awards
 13th Primetime Emmy Awards
 14th Primetime Emmy Awards
 15th British Academy Film Awards
 16th Tony Awards

References

External links
 The 34th Annual Academy Awards at IMDb
 List of winners at Infoplease

Academy Awards ceremonies
1961 film awards
1961 awards in the United States
1962 in California
1962 in American cinema
April 1962 events in the United States
20th century in Santa Monica, California